Commuter rails in Surabaya metropolitan area consists of separate commuter-type economy-class local train services operated by KAI Commuter in Surabaya, East Java, Indonesia and surrounding areas, such as Gresik, Mojokerto, Pasuruan, Sidoarjo and Lamongan. The trains are KA Komuter Surabaya-Bangil (Surabaya-Bangil Commuter Train), KA Komuter Surabaya-Pasuruan (Surabaya-Pasuruan Commuter Train), KA Komuter Sulam (Sulam Commuter Train), KA Jenggala (Jenggala Train) and KA Komuter Sidoarjo-Indro (Sidoarjo-Indro Commuter Train).

These trains currently uses INKA-built Kereta Rel Diesel Indonesia (KRDI) diesel multiple unit (DMU) for their service.

Commuter trains
KA Komuter Surabaya-Bangil is a commuter train serving Surabaya Kota station for Bangil station and vice versa. The train was first launched on 9 February 2004 as KA Delta Ekspres and inaugurated by President Megawati Sukarnoputri, serving Surabaya and Sidoarjo. Several stops were built by KAI along the Surabaya–Sidoarjo railway line to support the train's operation, but in 2021 all stops were closed. The route was extended further to Porong station in December 2017, and finally to Bangil station starting from December 2019. Formerly using Nippon Sharyo-built MCW 302 DMU, currently the train using KRDI DMU for its service.

KA Komuter Surabaya–Pasuruan (or KA Kompas) is a commuter train serving Surabaya Kota station for Pasuruan station and vice versa. An extended line of KA Komuter Surabaya–Bangil, it was launched on 10 February 2021 as the 2021 train timetable (Gapeka 2021) was started.

KA Komuter Sulam is a commuter train serving Surabaya Pasar Turi station for Lamongan station and vice versa. "Sulam" itself is the abbreviation for Surabaya and Lamongan, indicating the train terminus. The train was first launched in 2004.

KA Jenggala is a commuter train serving Surabaya Kota station for Mojokerto station and Sidoarjo station, vice versa. First operating on 12 November 2014, the train is the first train operating in the reactivated Tarik–Sidoarjo railway line.

KA Komuter Sidoarjo-Indro is a commuter train serving Sidoarjo station for Indro station in Gresik and vice versa. First operating on 10 February 2021, the train is the first train operating in the partly reactivated, previously freight-only Indro–Kandangan railway line.

Between 2009 and 2013, KA Arek Surokerto ([id], Arek Surokerto Train) was operational, serving Surabaya Gubeng station for Mojokerto station and vice versa, and make a stop in each station. "Arek Surokerto" stands for Angkutan Rakyat Ekonomi Kecil Surabaya-Mojokerto (Small Economy People's Transport Surabaya-Mojokerto). The train was using INKA-built electro-diesel train as its rolling stock.

Other local trains
Besides the aforementioned trains, there are a number of medium-range economy-class local trains services between Surabaya and several regencies.

 KA Ekonomi Lokal Bojonegoro, a train route starting from Bojonegoro station for Sidoarjo station and vice versa (make a stop in each station).
 KA Ekonomi Lokal Kertosono, a train route starting from Surabaya Kota station for Kertosono station and vice versa (make a stop in each station excluding Ngagel).
KA Dhoho and Penataran, two train routes starting from Surabaya Kota station for Blitar station and vice versa through Mojokerto for Dhoho and Sidoarjo for Penataran (make a stop in each station excluding Ngagel).

Gallery

See also
 Rail transport in Indonesia

References

External links
  Jadwal KRD Kertosono 2015
  
  
  

Passenger rail transport in Indonesia
Surabaya
East Java
Transport in East Java